Li Bonan (born November 1978) is a Chinese director.

Li has produced over forty full-length plays, including How Much Love can be Borrowed (2006), Single Lady (2008), Married to a Budget Husband (2009) and Fake Single (2010). His plays have won numerous awards, including the 2nd National Drama Culture Award of China, the Golden Lion Award (the highest award in the performing arts in China), and Best Director Award at the 9th International Theatre Festival Donzdorf, Germany.

Early life and career 
Li was born in 1978 in Beijing. He holds a Bachelor of Arts and an MFA in directing from the Central Academy of Drama. Li was also educated at Beijing Film Academy and Shanghai Theatre Academy.

Upon his graduation from the academy,, Li directed his first full-length play, How Much Love can be Borrowed (2006). It earned critical acclaim and remains one of the highest-grossing theatrical productions in China.

Li then created the Love Trilogy, which consists of three full-length plays focusing on the relationship issues of China's new generation. The plays in the sequence are Single Lady (2008), Married to a Budget Husband (2009) and Fake Single (2010). The Love Trilogy was adapted to books, and TV series. Li' is known for adapting contemporary stories on stage, and also for conveying traditional context with a modern twist.

Li is the artistic director of Li Bonan Theatre Studio, a member of the Tenth National Committee of the China Federation of Literary and Art Circles, and acknowledged by the China Ministry of Culture. He also serves as the artistic director at several regional theatres and performing art organizations across China.

Honours and awards 

 2009: Shandong International Experimental Theatre Festival, Best Play, Best Director, for Camouflaging
 2010: Most Popular Director of the Year, Sina China

Young Theatrical Director of the Year, The Global Times

 2011: National Drama Culture Award, Best Original Play, Best Director, for Fake Single

BeSeTo Theatre Festival, Best Director

Shandong International Experimental Theatre Festival, Best Director

 2012: the Golden Lion Award, Best Director
 2013: Top 10 in the Theatrical Director category of the 2012 China Performing Arts Industry Ranking
 2014: International Theatre Academy Award of the Central Academy of Drama, Best Play, for Fake Single
 2015: International Theatre Festival Donzdorf, Germany, Best Play, Best Director, for Confucius

International Theatre Academy Award of the Central Academy of Drama, Best Play, for Single Lady

 2016: Shanghai Critics’ Choice Awards, Best Play, for Dwelling in the Fuchun Mountains Legend

Works

Full-length plays

One-act plays

References 

1978 births
Living people
Central Academy of Drama alumni
Chinese theatre directors